Miguel Poblet Orriols (18 March 1928 – 6 April 2013) was a Spanish professional cyclist, who had over 200 professional victories from 1944 to 1962. He was the first Spanish rider to wear the yellow jersey in the Tour de France, and in 1956 he became the first of only three riders to win stages in the three Grand Tours in the same year. (The other two are Pierino Baffi and Alessandro Petacchi.)
He won the Milan–San Remo classic race on two occasions and took 26 stage wins in the three Grand Tours. His twenty-stage wins in the Giro d'Italia makes him the third most successful foreign rider in the "Giro" behind Eddy Merckx (25) and Roger De Vlaeminck (22). Poblet was of short stature who had great power, he was the first Spanish rider to be a specialist in one day races in an age when Spain only produced climbers. He had a lightning fast sprint, but could also climb well, taking the Spanish Mountain championships on three occasions and the mountainous Volta a Catalunya twice. His nickname whilst riding was "La Flecha Amarilla" (the Yellow Arrow) due to the yellow kit of his Ignis team.

Biography
Poblet was born at Montcada i Reixac in the northern suburbs of Barcelona, Catalonia, Spain. His father Enrique owned a bicycle shop in Barcelona and he encouraged his son to take up racing seriously at a young age and supplied him with all the necessary equipment. Despite turning professional in 1944, at the age of 16, Poblet’s career did not really take off internationally until 1955 when he was invited to be part of the Spanish team at the Tour de France; at that time the Tour invited national squads rather than trade teams. Poblet made an immediate effect at the Tour when he won the opening stage between Le Havre and Dieppe becoming the first Spaniard to wear the yellow jersey. He held onto the jersey in the afternoon Team time trial but lost it next day to Dutchman Wout Wagtmans. However, Poblet had more glory at that year's Tour when he took the prestigious final stage into Paris at the Parc des Princes stadium.

Success at the 1955 Tour ensured an invitation to the 1956 Giro d’Italia where he took four stages, this followed three stage wins in the Vuelta a España, he took another Tour de France stage win that year between Angers and La Rochelle to complete a grand slam of stages in Grand Tours for 1956. Only Pierino Baffi and Alessandro Petacchi have been able to repeat this. By this time Poblet was riding for the Faema team led by Rik Van Looy but he left the team early in 1957 after being told he was not going to ride Milan–San Remo. He signed for the Italian squad Ignis and promptly won Milano–Torino for them; a week later he was victorious at Milan–San Remo. He stayed with the Ignis squad for the rest of his career.

Poblet prepared meticulously for Milan–San Remo, designing a training course in Catalonia similar to the Italian classics parcours with a big climb similar to the Turchino Pass followed by a series of smaller hills. He finished second in 1958 behind Van Looy and then won again in 1959 after breaking away from the peloton with 400 metres to go. He came close to winning Paris–Roubaix in 1958 coming second to Leon Van Daele and third in 1960 when Pino Cerami won. For 45 years, he was the only Spaniard ever to have got on the podium at the Roubaix Velodrome, until Juan Antonio Flecha took the third step in 2005 and second in 2007.

After retirement Poblet continued to live in the Barcelona area, in 2001 the local sports arena was named after him and more than 2000 people turned out to pay tribute to him. Poblet was awarded the Creu de Sant Jordi in December 2002, one of the highest civil distinctions in Catalonia. In 2004 he was a special guest of the Vuelta a España as it passed through Catalonia. He died on 6 April 2013 from kidney failure.

Major results

1946
Two stage wins and 4th overall Vuelta a Burgos
1947
1st GP Primavera
Three stage wins and 5th overall Volta a Catalunya
 Spanish mountain champion
1948
Two stage wins and 7th overall Volta a Catalunya
Spanish mountain champion
1949
Spanish sprint champion
Four stage wins and 2nd overall Volta a Catalunya
Spanish mountain champion
1951
Spanish sprint champion
Two stage wins Volta a Catalunya
1952
Spanish Madison champion
First overall and three stage wins Volta a Catalunya
Four stage wins Tour of Castille
1953
Two stage wins Volta a Catalunya
1954
Five stage wins Vuelta a Aragón
Three stage wins Volta a Catalunya
1955
Two stage wins Tour de France
1st overall GP Midi Libre
11th Tour of Lombardy
1956
One stage win Tour de France
Four stage wins Giro d’
'Italia
Three stage wins Vuelta a España
1957
1st Milan–San Remo
Spanish RR champion
1st Milano–Torino
6th overall Giro d’Italia
1958
1st Points competition and three stage wins Giro d’Italia
2nd Tour of Lombardy
2nd Paris–Roubaix
2nd Milan–San Remo
1959
Spanish sprint champion
Three stage wins 1959 Giro d’Italia
3rd Tour of Lombardy
Three stage wins Volta a Catalunya
3rd Paris–Brussels
1960
Three stage wins Giro dqItalia
Spanish sprint champion
1st overall and three stage wins Volta a Catalunya
1961
Spanish sprint champion
1962
Spanish sprint champion

References

External links

 
 Tour de France database on Miguel Poblet

1928 births
2013 deaths
Spanish male cyclists
Spanish Tour de France stage winners
Spanish Giro d'Italia stage winners
Spanish Vuelta a España stage winners
Cyclists from Catalonia
People from Vallès Occidental
Sportspeople from the Province of Barcelona
Deaths from kidney failure